Isabel Suárez Yupanqui born as Palla Chimpu Ocllo (1523-1571), was a princess of the Inca Empire. She was born to Sapa Inca Túpac Huallpa (r. 1533). 

She married Sebastián Garcilaso de la Vega y Vargas, and was the mother of Inca Garcilaso de la Vega. After she was widowed, she married secondly Juan de Pedroche and had two daughters: one, Ana Ruíz, married her cousin Martín de Bustinza, and had issue, while the other, Luisa de Herrera, married Pedro Márquez de Galeoto, becoming the mother of Alonso Márquez de Figueroa.

References

 Sánchez, Luis Alberto: La literatura peruana. Derrotero para una historia cultural del Perú, tomo I. Cuarta edición y definitiva. Lima, P. L. Villanueva Editor, 1975.

Inca royalty
16th-century births
Spanish colonization of the Americas
Indigenous people of the Andes
1571 deaths